The Airdrome DeHavilland DH-2 is an American amateur-built aircraft, designed and produced by Airdrome Aeroplanes, of Holden, Missouri. The aircraft is supplied as a kit for amateur construction.

The aircraft is an 80% scale replica of the First World War British Airco DH.2 fighter, used to counter the Fokker Scourge of 1915. The replica is built from modern materials and powered by modern engines.

Design and development
The Airdrome DeHavilland DH-2 features a strut-braced biplane layout, a single-seat open cockpit, fixed conventional landing gear and a single engine in pusher configuration.

The aircraft is made from steel and aluminum, with its flying surfaces covered in doped aircraft fabric. The standard engine used is the  Valley Engineering Big Twin four stroke engine. Building time from the factory-supplied kit is estimated at 350 hours by the manufacturer.

Operational history
Two examples had been completed by December 2011.

Specifications (DeHavilland DH-2)

References

Homebuilt aircraft
Single-engined pusher aircraft